The 2014 Seguros Bolívar Open Barranquilla was a professional tennis tournament played on clay courts. It was the fourth edition of the tournament which was part of the 2014 ATP Challenger Tour. It took place in Barranquilla, Colombia between 24 and 30 March 2014.

Singles main-draw entrants

Seeds

Other entrants
The following players received wildcards into the singles main draw:
  Eduardo Schwank
  Nicolás Barrientos
  Carlos Salamanca
  Alexander Zverev

The following players received entry from the qualifying draw:
  Jason Kubler
  Jonathan Eysseric
  José Hernández
  Antonio Veić

Doubles main-draw entrants

Seeds

Other entrants
The following pairs received wildcards into the doubles main draw:
  Alexander Zverev /  Mischa Zverev
  Jhan Fontalvo Silva /  José Hernández
  Gregorio Cordonnier /  Marco Trungelliti

Champions

Singles

 Pablo Cuevas def.  Martin Kližan, 6–3, 6–1

Doubles

 Pablo Cuevas /  Pere Riba def.  František Čermák and  Michail Elgin, 6–4, 6–3

External links
Official Website

Seguros Bolivar Open Barranquilla
Seguros Bolívar Open Barranquilla
2014 in Colombian tennis